Guthrie is an English-language surname with several independent origins. In some cases the surname is derived from a place in Scotland, located near Forfar, Guthrie, Angus, which is derived from the Gaelic gaothair, meaning "windy place". Another origin of the name is from the Scottish Gaelic MagUchtre, meaning "son of Uchtre". The personal name Uchtre is of uncertain origin. Another origin of the surname Guthrie is as an Anglicisation of the Irish Ó Fhlaithimh, meaning "descendant of Flaitheamh".

People with the surname Guthrie
 A. B. Guthrie Jr. (1901–1991), American author
 Allan Guthrie (born 1965), Scottish author
 Arlo Guthrie (born 1947), American folk singer
 Bruce Guthrie, Australian journalist
 Charles Guthrie, Baron Guthrie of Craigiebank (born 1938), British Army field marshal
 Charles Claude Guthrie (1880–1963), American physiologist  
 Dalton Guthrie (born 1995), American baseball player
 Danny Guthrie (born 1987), English footballer
 Diane Guthrie-Gresham (born 1971), Jamaican track and field athlete
 Donald Guthrie (physician) (1880–1958), founder of the Guthrie Clinic and Guthrie Medical Group
 Donald Guthrie (politician) (1840–1915), Canadian politician
 Donald Guthrie (theologian) (1916–1992), British New Testament scholar
 Edwin Ray Guthrie (1886–1959), American psychologist
 Francis Guthrie (1831–1899), South African mathematician who first posed the four-color problem
 Frank Guthrie (disambiguation)
 Frederick Guthrie (1833–1886), British scientific writer and professor 
 George Guthrie (disambiguation)
 Gwen Guthrie (1950–1999), American musician
 Helen Guthrie (fl. 1592), Scottish petitioner
 Herbert Guthrie-Smith (1860–1940), New Zealand conservationist and author
 Hugh Guthrie (1866–1939), Canadian politician and Cabinet minister
 J. Hunter Guthrie (1901–1974), American Jesuit philosopher
 Jack Guthrie (1915–1948), American songwriter and performer
 Janet Guthrie (born 1938), American aerospace engineer and race car driver
 James Guthrie (disambiguation)
 Jeremy Guthrie (born 1979), American professional baseball pitcher
 Jim Guthrie (singer-songwriter), Canadian singer and songwriter
 Jim Guthrie (racing driver) (born 1961), American race car driver
 Jimmie Guthrie (1897–1937), Scottish motorcycle racer
 John Guthrie (disambiguation)
 Julian Guthrie, American journalist and author
 Kathleen Guthrie (1905–1981), British artist
 K.C. Guthrie, fictional character in Canadian TV series Degrassi: The Next Generation
 Malcolm Guthrie (1903–1972), British professor of Bantu languages
 Mark Guthrie (born 1965), American baseball player
 Mark Guthrie, bassist for Scottish band The Supernaturals
 Martha Guthrie (1894–1941), American amateur tennis player
 Mary Jane Guthrie (1895–1975), American zoologist and cancer researcher
 Michelle Guthrie (born 1965), Australian television executive
 Owen Levi Guthrie (Steel Mill Worker) (1914-2001)
 Robert Guthrie (disambiguation)
 Robin Guthrie (artist) (1902–1971), British painter and illustrator
 Robin Guthrie (charity administrator) (1937–2009), British charity administrator and public servant
 Robin Guthrie (born 1962), Scottish musician
 Samuel Guthrie (United States physician) (1782–1848), discoverer of chloroform
 Sarah Lee Guthrie (born 1979), American folk singer
 Savannah Guthrie (born 1971), American attorney and television journalist
 Scott Guthrie, American computer programmer
 Shirley Guthrie (1927–2004), American theologian
 Stewart Guthrie (1948–1990), New Zealand Police officer awarded the George Cross
 Thomas Guthrie (1803–1873), Scottish philanthropist
 Thomas Anstey Guthrie (1856–1934), English novelist 
 Trevor Guthrie (born 1973), Canadian musician
 Sir Tyrone Guthrie (1900–1971), English stage director and playwright, founder of Guthrie Theater, Minneapolis
 Vanessa Guthrie (born 1961), Australian businesswoman
 W. K. C. Guthrie (1906–1981), Scottish classical scholar and historian of philosophy
 Walter Murray Guthrie (1869–1911), British politician
 Wanza Runge Guthrie (1937-2015), Restaurant Owner 
 William Guthrie (boxer) (born 1967), American pugilist  
 William Dameron Guthrie (born 1859), American lawyer
 William Norman Guthrie (born 1868), American clergyman
 Woody Guthrie (1912–1967), American folk singer

Groups named Guthrie
 Clan Guthrie

See also
Guthrie (disambiguation)

References

English-language surnames
Scottish surnames